The 1901 international cricket season was from April 1901 to September 1901.

Season overview

June

South Africa in England

August

Holland in England

September

England in USA

References

International cricket competitions by season
1901 in cricket